Walford is a fictional London borough in the BBC soap opera EastEnders

Walford may also refer to:

Places
England
 Walford, Letton and Newton, Herefordshire
 Walford, Ross-on-Wye, Herefordshire
 Walford, Shropshire
 Walford Heath, Shropshire
 Walford, Somerset
United States
Walford, Iowa

Schools
Walford Anglican School for Girls in Adelaide, South Australia
Alec Reed Academy, formerly Walford High School in Northolt in the London Borough of Ealing

People
 Sir Henry Walford Davies (1869–1941), English composer
 Clive Walford (born 1991),  American football tight end
 Cornelius Walford (1827–1885), English author on insurance topics
 Edward Walford (1823–1897), English author and historian 
 Garth Neville Walford (1882–1915), English Victoria Cross recipient
 John Walford (1762-1789), wife murderer of Over Stowey, Somerset.
 Lionel Walford (1905–1979), American ichthyologist
 Lucy Bethia Walford (1845–1915), Scottish author
 Michael Walford (1915–2002) English cricketer and field hockey player
 Rex Walford (1934–2011), British educator and geographer
 Ricky Walford (born 1963), Australian rugby league player 
 Roy Walford, M.D. (1924–2004), Life Extension pioneer
 Steve Walford (born 1958), English football player and coach

Literature and publishing
Walford's County Families annual volumes

See also
Watford (disambiguation)
Walkford